Ed Barker (born February 21, 1935) is an American politician. He served as a Democratic member for the 18th district of the Georgia State Senate.

Life and career 
Barker was born in Richmond County, Georgia. He attended Mercer University.

In 1973, Barker was elected to represent the 18th district of the Georgia State Senate. He served until the 1990s.

References 

1935 births
Living people
People from Richmond County, Georgia
Democratic Party Georgia (U.S. state) state senators
20th-century American politicians
Mercer University alumni